AN/SPS-6 is a two-dimensional radar manufactured by Bendix and Westinghouse Electric. It was used by the US Navy as a first-generation air-search radar after World War II, and was widely exported to allies. In addition, the improved AN/SPS-12 is the derivative types developed in other countries.

AN/SPS-6 
This machine was developed as a successor to the SR-3 or SR-6 radar, which is an L Band air search radar that has been used in the past. The development is said to have been influenced by AN/TPS-1, which was a portable air radar for the ground. As the antenna, a parabolic antenna that uses a horn antenna as the primary radiation source is adopted. In addition, the modular design allows the configuration to be expanded or contracted according to the ship on which it is mounted. Initially, the following three models existed.

AN/SPS-6 
The antenna dimensions were 18 ft (5,500 mm) x 5 ft (1,500 mm), the beamwidth was 3 ° x 10 °, and it could be detected at 80 nmi (150 km) for the fighter.

AN/SPS-6A 
The antenna size was similar to -6, but the beamwidth was 3 ° x 20 ° and a fighter could be detected at 70 nmi (130 km).

AN/SPS-6B 
The beam width is 3 ° x 30 °, 60 nmi (110 km) for fighter aircraft (about one-third for FH-1), and for B-29 at an altitude of 31,000 ft (9,400 m). It was detected at 145 nmi (269 km).

The prototype was handed over to the Navy in 1948, and in September of the same year,  began testing. The mass-produced AN / SPS-6A / B began delivery in sequence from 1950 to 1952, including radar picket ships, Essex-class aircraft carriers with (SCB-27A), and Independence-class aircraft carriers. It was installed in the anti-submarine aircraft carrier with (SCB-54). However, when 25 sets of AN/SPS-6, 45 sets of AN/SPS-6A, and 110 sets of AN/SPS-6B were produced, the production shifted to the improved AN/SPS-6C to AN/SPS-6C-E.

AN/SPS-6C 
More AN/SPS-6C-E were produced. The AN/SPS-6C is similar to the AN/SPS-6B, but with a lighter antenna, 800 lb (360 kg) compared to the conventional 1,000 lb (450 kg). On the other hand, for this reason, the shock resistance is low and the rotation speed is also reduced.

AN/SPS-6D 
The AN/SPS-6D is based on the AN/SPS-6C and omits the IFF, and the final model.

AN/SPS-6E 
The AN/SPS-6E, uses a more improved transmitter.

On board ships

United States Navy 
  
 Saipan-class aircraft carrier 
 Independence-class aircraft carrier 
 Iowa-class battleship
 Worcester-class cruiser
 Des Moines-class cruiser
 Porter-class destroyer 
 Fletcher-class destroyer 
 Allen M. Sumner-class destroyer
 Gearing-class destroyer
  Mitscher-class destroyer
 Dealey-class destroyer escort
 Claud Jones-class destroyer escort
 
 Suribachi-class ammunition ship

Maritime Self-Defense Force 
 Harukaze-class destroyer

Italian Navy 
 San Giorgio-class destroyer
 Impetuoso-class destroyer
 Centauro-class frigate

Royal Canadian Navy 
 Tribal-class destroyer

Portugal 
 Admiral Pereira da Silva-class frigate

AN/SPS-12 
AN/SPS-12 is a completely improved version based on SPS-6C. The antenna measures 17 ft (5.2 m) x 6 ft (1.8 m), weighs 550 lb (250 kg), and has a PRF of 300 to 600 pps. The radar coverage was similar to the AN/SPS-6B. In addition, it could be operated in an environment with a wind speed of up to 70 kn (36 m / s).

The first unit was handed over in September 1953. Later, a new and powerful transmitter (12 MW) could be introduced, which could deliver a detection range of 90 nmi (170 km) and up to 200 nmi (370 km) for jet aircraft. As an improved version, the AN/SPS-12B was developed once, but its introduction was discontinued, and then the AN/SPS-12C, which introduced an RCA parametric amplifier in the transmitter and receiver, was deployed.

The AN/SPS-12 series was produced in 139 sets in the United States and licensed in Italy. It is also a derivative base along with AN/SPS-6.

The successor, AN/SPS-28 (a miniaturized version of AN / SPS-17), began deployment in 1957, but was soon replaced by the better AN/SPS-29. All of these used the same UHF band (B Band) as CXAM during the war.

On board ships

United States Navy 
 Boston-class cruiser
 Mitscher-class destroyer
 Guardian-class radar picket ship

Italian Navy 
  Andrea Doria-class cruiser
 Impavido-class destroyer
 Alpino-class frigate
 Bergamini-class frigate

Royal Canadian Navy 
 HMCS Bonaventure
 St. Laurent-class destroyer
 Restigouche-class destroyer
 Mackenzie-class destroyer
 Annapolis-class destroyer

Maritime Self-Defense Force 
 JDS Wakaba
 Ayanami-class destroyer
 Ariake-class destroyer

OPS-1 / OPS-2 
In the early 1950s, the Japan Maritime Self-Defense Force obtained AN/SPS-6 under the Military Assistance Plan (MAP) based on the MSA Agreement for installation on the Harukaze-class destroyer, and domestically produced it based on this. The OPS-1 was developed and installed in the first Akizuki-class destroyer. In addition, the Ayanami-class destroyer was equipped with AN/SPS-12, and this technology was backfitted to the OPS-1. Later, the OPS-2, which had the same transmitter and receiver and a smaller antenna, was also developed for installation on the Isuzu-class destroyer. The maximum detection distance when targeting PV-2 was 50 nautical miles (93 km) for OPS-2.

In the ships built from between 1958 and 1960, the OPS-1 was mounted on destroyers and the OPS-2 was mounted on destroyer escorts. Ships after 1962 and 1966 are now equipped with the B Band OPS-11. However, after that, OPS-14 was developed based on OPS-1 and OPS-2.

OPS-1 

 Ayanami-class destroyer
 Murasame-class destroyer
 Akizuki-class destroyer

OPS-2 
 Ikazuchi-class destroyer escort
 Isuzu-class destroyer escort
 Kitakami-class destroyer escort

SPS-501 
It was developed in Canada by combining the AN/SPS-12 transmitter with the LW-03 antenna manufactured by Signar of the Netherlands. In 1967, it was commissioned on board HMCS Bonaventure of the Navy. It was also installed on Iroquois-class destroyers until the TRUMP was refurbished from the late 1980s to the 1990s.

Gallery

See More 

 List of radars
 Radar configurations and types
 Air-search radar

Citations

References 
 Norman Friedman (2006). The Naval Institute Guide to World Naval Weapon Systems.  Naval Institute Press.  ISBN 
 Self-Defense Force Equipment Yearbook 2006-2007. Asaun News Agency. ISBN 4-7509-1027-9

Naval radars
Military radars of Japan
Military radars of the United States
Military equipment introduced from 1945 to 1949
Bendix Corporation